Martin Damm and Cyril Suk were the defending champions, but lost in the semifinals to Lucas Arnold Ker and Martín García.

František Čermák and Leoš Friedl won the tournament by defeating Arnold Ker and García 6–3, 7–5 in the final.

Seeds

Draw

Draw

References

External links
 Main draw (ATP)
 ITF tournament profile

Doubles
Austrian Open Kitzbühel